The 1914 Auburn Tigers football team represented Auburn University (then called the Alabama Polytechnic Institute) in the 1914 Southern Intercollegiate Athletic Association football season. It was the Tigers' 23rd overall season and they competed as a member of the Southern Intercollegiate Athletic Association (SIAA). The team was led by head coach Mike Donahue, in his 10th year, and played their home games at Drake Field in Auburn, Alabama. They finished as SIAA Champions with a record of eight wins, zero losses and one tie (8–0–1 overall, 4–0–1 in the SIAA) and outscored opponents 193–0.

Auburn's strong defense, which held opponents scoreless all season, helped the team garner a retroactive national title by James Howell's computer rating system. Auburn University does not claim or otherwise acknowledge this title.

Before the season
Auburn returned another powerful team minus Kirk Newell. "Bull" Kearley was shifted from halfback to end to add speed to the defensive line.

Schedule

Season summary

Marion Military Institute
The season opened with a 28–0  win over the Marion Military Institute.

at Florida

Sources:

In Jacksonville, Auburn defeated the Florida Gators 20–0. Auburn's team was nearly as strong as the season before and claims another SIAA title. In contrast to the prior season, the 20–0 loss was seen as a moral victory and sign of progress for the Gators. However, the Florida also lost its captain. John Sutton left the game feeling poorly, and further examination revealed a weak heart. Auburn's backfield performed well, and Florida gave way by the second half. Bedie Bidez made two touchdowns.

Clemson
Auburn beat the Clemson Tigers 28–0.

West Alabama A. C.
Against West Alabama Athletic Club came the season's biggest win, 60–0.

Mississippi A&M
Despite several fumbles, Auburn beat the Mississippi Aggies 19–0. One touchdown came on a delayed pass of 35 yards.

The starting lineup was Steed (left end), Culpepper (left tackle), Sample (left guard), Pitts (center), Taylor (right guard), Louiselle (right tackle), Robinson (right end), Arnold (quarterback), Hairston (left halfback), Hart (right halfback), Harris (fullback).

Georgia Tech

Sources:

Auburn defeated John Heisman's Georgia Tech team 14–0. Tech would not lose to a southern team for 5 years after this.

Auburn scored first in the second quarter, Prendergast carrying the ball over. Red Hart had a 10-yard touchdown run in the fourth for the other score.

The starting lineup was Kearley (left end), Steed (left tacle), Taylor (left guard), Pitts (center), Thigpen (right guard), Louiselle (right tackle), Robinson (end), Hairston (quarterback), Prendergast (left halfback), Hart (right halfback), Harris (fullback).

Vanderbilt

Sources:

In dreary weather, Auburn beat the Vanderbilt Commodores 6–0. In less than eight minutes of play, Red Harris made the decisive touchdown.

The starting lineup was Kearley (left end), Steed (left tacle), Taylor (left guard), Pitts (center), Thigpen (right guard), Louiselle (right tackle), Robinson (end), Hairston (quarterback), Prendergast (left halfback), Hart (right halfback), Harris (fullback).

Georgia
All-American David Paddock and the Georgia Bulldogs held the Tigers to a scoreless tie. Auburn fumbled often in their own territory, then stood "like Petain at Verdun."

Carlisle
In final game of the season, Auburn defeated the Carlisle Indians led by Pete Calac and coached by Pop Warner. It was the first intersectional game in Atlanta.

Postseason
Auburn claimed a share of an SIAA title.

References

Additional sources
 

Auburn
Auburn Tigers football seasons
College football undefeated seasons
Auburn Tigers football